Zherebets is a river in eastern Ukraine. It is a tributary of the Donets, and mainly flows through the western areas of the Donbas, including Svatove Raion, Sievierodonetsk Raion, and Kramatorsk Raion. The length of the river is approximately 88 km, and the floodplain is almost 1,000 km2 in area.

References

Rivers of Luhansk Oblast
Rivers of Donetsk Oblast